Gillespie Run is a stream in the U.S. state of West Virginia.

Gillespie Run was named after Richard Gillespie.

See also
List of rivers of West Virginia

References

Rivers of Ritchie County, West Virginia
Rivers of West Virginia